Kenneth Postman (born 5 November 1955) is a South African cricketer. He played in one first-class match for Border in 1979/80.

See also
 List of Border representative cricketers

References

External links
 

1955 births
Living people
South African cricketers
Border cricketers
Cricketers from East London, Eastern Cape